Arizona State University, Polytechnic High School is a public charter University-preparatory school, located in Mesa, Arizona, United States. The Polytechnic High School and STEM Academy (the latter of which serves as an elementary and middle school) is located on the Arizona State University Polytechnic campus next to the Phoenix-Mesa Gateway Airport.

The Arizona State University, Polytechnic High School is part of a series of preparatory schools for Arizona State University, including ASU Preparatory Academy, Phoenix, ASU Preparatory Academy, Casa Grande and ASU Prep Digital.

This ASU Polytechnic High School currently enrolls from Grade 7 to Grade 12. The Polytechnic High School offers various subjects and college opportunities to ensure that each and every student receives the support and help they need. The high school offers the internationally acclaimed Cambridge Curriculum, that prepares students to enroll in university classes by their junior year in high school.

As of 2020, the current Director of Secondary Learning, a figure similar to a principal, is Claudia Mendoza with Michael Weakley serving as the Dean of Students.

As of the start of the 2019–2020 school year, ASU Preparatory Academy Polytechnic High School enrolled 8th grade students as part of their high school attendance, however as of the 2020–2021 school year, 7th graders have also been added to the school attendance.

History 
ASU Preparatory Polytechnic High School was founded in 2008 under the name of University Public Schools Inc. (UPSI). The Polytechnic school was the first ASU Prep school, and was located in Mesa, Arizona. The next campus created was the downtown Phoenix campus.

ASU Prep Polytechnic was certified as a STEM school by AdvancEd, making it one of only two schools in Arizona to be given that accreditation, and one hundred in the United States. The strongest factor in AdvancEd's decision to give the Polytechnic school this certification was their conversations with the school's students during their certification visit.

In 2018, many improvements were made to the Polytechnic High School's campus, including a brand new two-story building with wet labs, administration spaces, ten new classrooms, and a "makerspace" with a variety of tools and resources for students to complete engineering-related projects. The Sacaton Hall building, which previously housed the school's administration space, was then used entirely for classrooms. In 2020, the Sacaton Hall began to be used entirely for seventh and eighth graders, who make up the school's "Spark Institute."

Academics 
Given its STEM school certification, ASU Preparatory Academy Polytechnic High School has a curriculum that is heavily based on science, technology, engineering, and math. The school is a college preparatory school, and allows students to take free Arizona State University classes for college credit when they are ready. ASU Prep Polytechnic also utilizes the Cambridge Curriculum, which is present in over 160 countries worldwide. For many Cambridge classes, students will take assessments at the end of the year that may give them the opportunity to earn college credit.

Extracurricular Activities 
ASU Preparatory Polytechnic High School offers a variety of clubs, including Student Government, Key Club, Cultural Diversity Club, Robotics, National Honor Society, National Junior Honor Society, and News Junkies.

Other clubs such as Fencing Club, Ping Pong Club, and Lightning McQueen Club have been founded at ASU Prep Polytechnic by students for periods of time but are not currently active.

Polytechnic High School's Student Council, shortened as "StuCo," is made up of representatives and leaders from each grade in the High School, not including 7th and 8th grades. According to its website, the Student Council "contributes to the needs of the community, upholds the pillars of ASU Preparatory Academy, represents the needs of the student body, and encourages student involvement and school pride." Former Student Council presidents have included Aundria Arneson (served 2017–2018), Hannah Tan (served 2018–2019), Caleb Myers (served 2019–2020), and the current president, Cooper Houseman. These presidents are elected by the students of ASU Preparatory Polytechnic High School at the beginning of each year. The Student Council puts on events for students such as dances, fundraisers, and talent shows. Houseman also introduced new event ideas such as weekly trivia nights after his election.

The 2020 Student Council election was the first one in which candidates for the position of president were not required to have prior experience in Student Council, due to the recent departure from the school of Peter Quinn, the former U.S. History teacher and Student Council advisor. This election was notable for the unprecedented campaign of candidate Cooper Houseman, who beat former Student Council vice president Diego Conrado in a narrow vote on November 13, 2020, despite having no former experience in Student Council or leadership positions in any other clubs at ASU Prep Polytechnic. Houseman began his election campaign on October 30, 2020, by announcing his candidacy on Instagram, with the campaign name of "Houseman 2020." His campaign's slogan was "Hardworking, Honest, Houseman." The Houseman 2020 campaign was one which featured many aggressive campaign tactics that had not previously been used in Student Council elections at ASU Preparatory Academy Polytechnic High School, such as the extremely frequent usage of social media, the creation of t-shirts and yard signs, rallies, and polls. A debate was held on November 9, 2020, between Houseman, Conrado, and candidate Zoi Delgado. Polytechnic High School's P.E. teacher and new Student Council advisor, Andrew McKinney, moderated the debate. On November 13, 2020, Houseman beat Conrado, Delgado, and 4 other candidates for the position of president of Student Council after receiving a plurality of 35.6% of the votes.

ASU Preparatory Polytechnic High School offers clubs that allow students to serve their community, such as Key Club, Cultural Diversity Club, and National Honor Society. Polytechnic High School's Key Club chapter hosts events at which members can give back to their community. Similarly, the Polytechnic High School chapter of National Honor Society requires members to participate in and keep track of community service throughout the school year. The Cultural Diversity Club aims to educate students about different cultures while also offering events related to community service.

The Polytechnic High School's robotics team competes in the annual FIRST Robotics Competition. The current team name is "Some Assembly Required," and its assigned number is 4111. Team 4111's rookie year was 2012, and since then it has competed at 11 different events in Arizona, including 3 state championships, in 2016, 2018, and 2019. The team's highest placement was in 2018, where it was ranked 27th at the Arizona State Championship during the FIRST Power Up season.

The News Junkies club allows students to create videos about important school announcements in order for students to be knowledgeable on upcoming events, changes, and other significant things going on at the Polytechnic High School. News Junkies has included actor and director Sean Astin as a recurring guest in several of their videos.

Athletics 
Polytechnic High School teams compete in the Canyon Athletic Association.

References 

High schools in Mesa, Arizona
Arizona State University
Public high schools in Arizona
Charter schools in Arizona
Educational institutions established in 2010
2010 establishments in Arizona